Joscelin Kate Lowden (born 3 October 1987) is a British professional racing cyclist, who currently rides for UCI Women's Continental Team . On 30 September 2021 she became the holder of the women's hour record.

Professional career

2021 season
In 2021, Lowden established herself as a team leader within Drops–Le Col by finishing eleventh overall at the Healthy Ageing Tour and fifth at Brabantse Pijl. Lowden took her first professional victory on Stage 4 of the Tour de Feminin. After launching a long range attack, she won the stage by over five minutes, earning the victory in the overall general classification.

In February 2021, Lowden set an unofficial hour record of 48.160km while in training, beating the existing record of 48.007km set by Vittoria Bussi. However, as it was not an official attempt, it did not qualify as a new record. It was later announced that Lowden would attempt an official assault on the record on 30 September at the Tissot Velodrome in Grenchen (Switzerland).

In August 2021, it was announced that Lowden had signed a two-year contract to join the newly formed Uno-X Women's Pro Cycling Team.

On 30 September 2021, she set a new world record mark of 48.405 km in one hour.

Personal life
Lowden's partner is fellow cyclist Dan Bigham.

Major results
2019
 3rd  Team relay, UCI Road World Championships
2021
 Hour record: 48.405 km
 1st  Overall Tour de Feminin
1st Stage 4
 2nd Time trial, National Road Championships
 5th Brabantse Pijl
 8th Time trial, UCI Road World Championships
 10th Overall The Women's Tour
 3rd   National Road Championships

References

External links
 

1987 births
Living people
British female cyclists
Place of birth missing (living people)
20th-century British women
21st-century British women